Steve Hayward (born 8 September 1971) is an English former professional footballer who played as a central midfielder in a sixteen-year career spanning from 1988 to 2004.

Career
Born in Pelsall near Walsall, Hayward began his career with Derby County and made his League debut in 1990, but found first-team opportunities limited. He joined Carlisle United in 1994 and won two promotions from Division Three and the 1997 Football League Trophy Final during his time at the club before moving to Fulham in 1997. He played a role in Fulham's promotion and run to the 5th round of the FA Cup in 1999. Hayward was signed by Barnsley in January 2001. That season he had made one league appearance for Fulham up to that point, which ironically was against Barnsley. Fulham would go on to get promoted to the Premier League that season in his absence. Hayward scored on his Barnsley debut; a 2–1 defeat at Burnley. Injuries hampered his stay at Barnsley and he retired in 2004.

Honours
Carlisle United
Football League Third Division winner: 1995-96
Football League Trophy winner: 1997; runner up: 1995-96
Football League Third Division Third Place Promotion: 1996-97

Fulham
Football League Division One winner: 1998-99

References

External links
 
 

English footballers
Derby County F.C. players
Carlisle United F.C. players
Fulham F.C. players
Barnsley F.C. players
Living people
1971 births
People from Pelsall
Sportspeople from Walsall
Association football midfielders